The following article presents a summary of the 1996 football (soccer) season in Paraguay.

First division
Thirteen teams participated in the championship which was played in two tournament (Apertura and Clausura), being the champions Guaraní and Cerro Porteño. In the Final Apertura versus Clausura Champions, Club Cerro Porteño won its 24th championship.

Relegation/Promotion
 Deportivo Humaitá automatically relegated to the second division after finishing last in the season-wide aggregate table.
 Cerro Corá promoted to the first division by winning the second division tournament.

Qualification to international competitions
Club Guaraní qualified to the 1997 Copa Libertadores by winning the Torneo Apertura.
Cerro Porteño qualified to the 1997 Copa Libertadores by winning the Torneo Clausura.
Sportivo Luqueño qualified to the 1997 Copa Conmebol like the runner-up of the Torneo Apertura.

Paraguay national team

Notes

References
 Paraguay 1996 by Eli Schmerler, Andy Bolander and Juan Pablo Andrés at RSSSF

 
Seasons in Paraguayan football
Paraguay 1996